CFMV-FM is a French-language Canadian radio station located in Chandler, Quebec.

Owned and operated by Radio du Golfe, it broadcasts on 96.3 MHz with an effective radiated power of 5,700 watts and a peak effective radiated power of 22,900 watts (class B). The station has an adult contemporary music format.

The station was licensed in 2004 on the frequency 92.1 MHz, then later moved to its current frequency.

The station shares its website with co-owned CJMC-FM in Sainte-Anne-des-Monts.

On October 2, 2009, CFMV applied to add a low-power transmitter on 104.1 MHz at Percé, Quebec. This application was denied on February 4, 2010, on the grounds that the station would not meet conditions in regards to programming.

References

External links
CFMV-FM
 

Fmv
Fmv
Fmv
Radio stations established in 2004
2004 establishments in Quebec